Frederik Jan Gustav Floris, Baron van Pallandt (4 May 1934 – 15 May 1994) was a Danish-Dutch singer best known as the male, guitar-playing half of the singing duo Nina & Frederik, which was together from the late 1950s to the late 1960s.

Van Pallandt was born in Copenhagen, the son of Floris Nicolas Ali, Baron van Pallandt, a former Ambassador for the Netherlands to Denmark and Dane Else Dagmar Hanina Blücher, Countess of Altona. He and his first wife, Nina van Pallandt, created a sensation first in Denmark and then elsewhere in Europe with music rooted in folk, ethnic, and calypso styles and, at first, their plain stage attire.

The couple had three children: Floris Nicolas Ali, Baron van Pallandt (10 June 1961 – 13 October 2006), Kirsa Eleonore Clara, Baroness van Pallandt (born 9 August 1963), and Ana Maria Else, Baroness van Pallandt (born 30 October 1965) and continued their musical careers until they parted in 1969, with their marriage eventually dissolved in 1976. The following year, on 10 May, van Pallandt married María Jesus de Los Rios y Coello de Portugal. Together, they had one child: Daniel Tilopa, Baron van Pallandt, who was born 12 May 1977.  In 1984, van Pallandt bought Burke's Peerage from The Holdway Group.

According to his first wife's memoir, van Pallandt was an avid sailor, and settled in the Philippines in the 1990s. He became involved with an Australian syndicate involved in the trafficking of cannabis, using his yacht the Tiaping to transport the shipments. On 15 May 1994, both he and his Filipina girlfriend Susannah were shot dead in a hut at Puerto Galera in the Philippines. The murderer is believed to have been another member of the syndicate. He was buried near his parents' grave in IJhorst in the Netherlands.

References

External links

1932 births
1994 deaths
Dutch nobility
Dutch people of Danish descent
Dutch pop singers
Musicians from Copenhagen
People murdered in the Philippines
English-language singers from the Netherlands
English-language singers from Denmark
20th-century Dutch male singers
Dutch people murdered abroad
Dutch murder victims